Charles and Bettie Birthright House is a historic home located at Clarkton, Dunklin County, Missouri. It was built in 1872, and began as a double pen, side gable home with full width porch.  A -story front addition about 1914 added a prominent front gable wing.  It sits on a brick and concrete foundation.

It was listed on the National Register of Historic Places in 2009.

References

Houses on the National Register of Historic Places in Missouri
Houses completed in 1872
Buildings and structures in Dunklin County, Missouri
National Register of Historic Places in Dunklin County, Missouri